Günter Heine (born 8 September 1919) was a German water polo player. He competed in the men's tournament at the 1952 Summer Olympics.

See also
 Germany men's Olympic water polo team records and statistics
 List of men's Olympic water polo tournament goalkeepers

References

External links
 

1919 births
Possibly living people
Water polo goalkeepers
German male water polo players
Olympic water polo players of Germany
Water polo players at the 1952 Summer Olympics